Major-General Sir Frederick Spencer Wilson Robb,  (8 October 1858 – 8 February 1948) was a senior British Army officer who went on to be Military Secretary.

Early life and education

Robb was born in St George Hanover Square, London, the son of Capt. John Robb, Naval aide-de-camp to Queen Victoria, and Mary Ann Boulton, daughter of manufacturer Matthew Robinson Boulton. He was educated at Harrow School, Trinity Hall, Cambridge, and the Royal Military College Sandhurst.

Military career
Robb was commissioned into the 68th (Durham) Regiment of Foot (Light Infantry) in 1880. He became Adjutant of his Regiment in 1890 before going on to be a Brigade Major at Aldershot in 1892. Appointed a Staff Captain in the Intelligence Division at Army Headquarters in 1895, he became Deputy Assistant Adjutant General at Army Headquarters in 1896.

Robb took part in the Nile expedition in 1898, and was promoted to lieutenant colonel on 16 November 1898. In early 1902 he became Assistant Adjutant General at Army Headquarters, with the substantive rank of colonel dated 1 January 1902. For his service in organizing troops during the Coronation of King Edward VII and Queen Alexandra, he was invested as a Member (fourth class) of the Royal Victorian Order (MVO) two days after the ceremony, on 11 August 1902. He was appointed Commander of 11th Infantry Brigade and Colchester Garrison in 1905 and was placed in charge of Administration at Aldershot in 1910. He became Assistant Chief of the Imperial General Staff in 1914.

Robb served in World War I as Military Secretary and was then placed in charge of Administration at Eastern Command in 1916, in succession to Major-General Richard M. Ruck. He retired in 1919.

Robb was also Colonel of the Durham Light Infantry from 1923 to 1928.

References

 

|-

1858 births
1948 deaths
British Army major generals
Military personnel from London
People educated at Harrow School
Alumni of Trinity Hall, Cambridge
Graduates of the Royal Military College, Sandhurst
Knights Commander of the Order of the Bath
Knights Commander of the Order of St Michael and St George
Knights Commander of the Royal Victorian Order
Durham Light Infantry officers
British Army generals of World War I
68th Regiment of Foot officers
British Army personnel of the Mahdist War